Plužac is a village located in Osečina Municipality, Kolubara District, Serbia.

The village is surrounded by scenic hills and paths and contains a monastery.

References

Populated places in Serbia